Typhoon Dujuan, known in the Philippines as Typhoon Onyok, was the strongest tropical cyclone to strike the Pearl River delta since Typhoon Hope in 1979. The 13th storm and 7th typhoon of the 2003 Pacific typhoon season, Dujuan developed on August 27 to the east of Taiwan. It initially moved to the northwest, slowly intensifying into a tropical storm while drawing moisture and rainfall over the Philippines. On the island of Luzon, one person was killed and areas were flooded. Dujuan quickly intensified after turning and moving quicker to the west-northwest, developing an eye. There, Dujuan left 590,000 people without power, killed three, and caused NT$200 million (NWD, $115 million USD) in crop damage. While moving through the South China Sea, the typhoon developed concentric eyewalls. Dujuan weakened to severe tropical storm status before making landfall on September 2 in southern China, just east of Hong Kong near Shenzhen, Guangdong. The storm dissipated the next day after causing 40 deaths and ¥2.3 billion (CNY, US$277 million) in damage. Most of the deaths were in Shenzhen where the storm moved ashore, and the city experienced a near-total power outage.

Meteorological history

On August 25, an area of convection persisted on satellite imagery on August 25. The thunderstorms pulsed and became better organized by August 27. The Joint Typhoon Warning Center (JTWC) also estimated a tropical cyclone formed on August 27. With a ridge to the north, the depression tracked slowly to the southwest. The system gradually organized while developing improved outflow to the south, although a tropical upper tropospheric trough to the north caused wind shear. On August 29, the JMA upgraded the depression to Tropical Storm Dujuan, although the JTWC had upgraded a day prior. That day, the Philippine Atmospheric, Geophysical and Astronomical Services Administration (PAGASA) began issuing advisories as the storm approached the region, naming it Onyok.

Shortly after it was named, Dujuan quickly intensified after an upper-level low to the northwest improved outflow to the north. On August 30, the ridge to the north built eastward, causing the storm to slow and turn more to the northwest. That day, an eye developed in center, and the JMA upgraded Dujuan to typhoon status. Subsequently, the typhoon accelerated to the west-northwest and later to the west. While moving westward through the South China Sea, the typhoon weakened slightly after its peak intensity due to an eyewall replacement cycle. At around 1200 UTC on September 2, Dujuan made landfall just east of Hong Kong, near Shenzhen. It was considered the strongest typhoon to strike the Pearl River Delta since Typhoon Hope in 1979. Dujuan rapidly weakened while continuing westward through China, dissipating on September 3 over Guangxi.

Preparations and impact

Although the center passed north of Luzon in the Philippines, Dujuan interacted with the monsoon to produce heavy rainfall over the country. Flash flooding in Metro Manila covered roads, causing traffic jams. Dangerous conditions caused many schools to close. The typhoon destroyed one house, and one person was killed in the country. Strong winds and high waves disrupted marine and airline traffic, with two flights canceled.

On August 31, officials in Taiwan issued a sea warning, advising for boats to avoid the Bashi Channel. Schools in southern Taiwan were closed, and transport was disrupted. The Ministry of National Defense canceled a military exercise due to the storm. Sustained winds reached  on Orchid Island offshore southeastern Taiwan, where gale-force winds were recorded for 13 hours and gusts reached . The typhoon was so strong that it destroyed the anemometer there. The typhoon left about 590,000 people without power at some point on the island. Transport was disrupted, and there was about NT$200 million (TWD, US$115 million). Dujuan killed three people and injured eight in southern Taiwan; one was a drowning in the Penghu islands, and another occurred when a man was blown out of his window in Taipei.

Before Dujuan made its final landfall, the Hong Kong Observatory initially issued a standby warning signal, and eventually raised it to a number 9 signal, the second-highest out of 10, for the first time since Typhoon York in 1999. The threat of the storm caused 360 flights to be canceled or delayed at Hong Kong International Airport, and the Hong Kong Stock Exchange was closed. Officials opened 27 shelters for residents, housing over 120 people. Dujuan caused minor flooding and two small landslides In Hong Kong, the typhoon knocked down 85 trees and caused a power outage affecting 300 people in Yuen Long. Dujuan injured 24 people in the territory, and four fishermen were missing and presumed drowned after their boat sank. Despite the close passage, damage was minor in Hong Kong. During the height of the storm, three people stole $1.3 million (USD) worth of jewelry, watches, and clothing from a store.

On the Chinese mainland, Dujuan produced  of rainfall in Puning in Guangdong, of which  fell in 24 hours. In Shenzen near where Dujuan made landfall, 90% of residents lost power, after strong winds knocked down power lines, although it was quickly restored. Also in the city, 20 people were killed, 16 of whom due to the collapse of a half-finished building that they were constructing. Officials had opened 272 emergency shelters before the storm's arrival, housing 4,950 people. In Huizhou, nine people were killed, and another three people died in Shanwei from the storm. Across Guangdong, the typhoon damaged roads, water and power systems, and telecommunication networks. About  of crops were damaged in the province, and 54,000 homes were destroyed. In Macau, 30 flights were delayed at Macau International Airport, and two bridges were closed. In Fuzhou in Fujian province, the storm knocked down 500 trees. Overall damage in China was estimated at ¥2.3 billion (CNY, US$277 million), and across Guangdong, the typhoon injured about 1,000 people and killed 40 people.

See also

Typhoon Usagi (2013)
Typhoon Dujuan (2015)

Notes

References

External links

JMA General Information of Typhoon Dujuan (0313) from Digital Typhoon
JMA Best Track Data of Typhoon Dujuan (0313) 
JMA Best Track Data (Graphics) of Typhoon Dujuan (0313)
JMA Best Track Data (Text)
JTWC Best Track Data of Typhoon 14W (Dujuan)
14W.DUJUAN from the U.S. Naval Research Laboratory

2003 Pacific typhoon season
Typhoons in China
2003 disasters in China
Typhoons
2003 disasters in the Philippines
Typhoons in the Philippines
Dujuan